Samuel Wadsworth Dunning (May 10, 1859 – April 19, 1915) was an American football, and military tactics instructor. He was an 1880 graduate of the United States Military Academy at West Point, New York.

He served as the head football coach at Utah State University–then known as Utah Agricultural College–in 1898, where he was also serving as an instructor of military science and tactics while stationed at Fort Douglas, Utah.

Head coaching record

References

External links
 

1859 births
1915 deaths
United States Military Academy alumni
Utah State Aggies football coaches
Sportspeople from New York (state)